The Idol Star Athletics Championships (abbr. 아육대) is a South Korean television program which aired for the first time in 2010. The program features celebrities, most notably Korean pop idols singers and groups, which compete in multi-sport events. The show is broadcast by MBC.

Idol Star Athletics Championships

Idol Championships sports

Athletics
50 m
50 m hurdles
60 m
70 m
70 m hurdles
100 m
100 m hurdles
110 m hurdles
4 × 50 m
4 x 50 m relay walk
4 × 100 m relay
200 m walk
Long jump
High jump
Javelin

E-sports
PlayerUnknown’s Battlegrounds (PUBG)
KartRider

Gymnastics
Aerobic gymnastics
Rhythmic gymnastics

Bowling
Bowling
Ten-pin bowling

Football
Football
Penalty shoot-out
Futsal

Other sports
Archery
Baseball pitching
Basketball
Curling
Dancesport
Dog agility
Equestrian – dressage
Fencing – individual sabre
Footvolley
Ssireum
Table tennis

Swimming
50 m freestyle

Record holders

Achievements by artists

Most valuable player

Overall winner

References

MBC TV original programming
South Korean variety television shows
South Korean game shows
2010 South Korean television series debuts
Sports entertainment